Computer Control Company, Inc. (1953–1966), informally known as 3C, was a pioneering minicomputer company known for its DDP-series (Digital Data Processor) computers, notably:
DDP-24 24-bit (1963)
DDP-224 24-bit (1965) 
DDP-116 16-bit (1965)
DDP-124 24-bit (1966) using monolithic ICs

It was founded in 1953 by Dr. Louis Fein, the physicist who had earlier designed the Raytheon RAYDAC computer.

The company moved to Framingham, Massachusetts in 1959. Prior to the introduction of the DDP-series it developed a series of digital logical modules, initially based on vacuum tubes.

In 1966 it was sold to Honeywell, Inc. As the Computer Controls division of Honeywell, it introduced further DDP-series computers, and was a $100,000,000 business until 1970 when Honeywell purchased GE's computer division and discontinued development of the DDP line.

In a 1970 essay, Murray Bookchin used the DDP-124 as his example of computer progress:

One of the oddest of the DDP series was the DDP 19 -- of which only three were built on custom order for the U.S. Weather service. Its architecture was based on a 19-bit word structure consisting of six octal bytes plus a sign bit, which in arithmetic operations could create the unusual value of "negative zero". One of these machines was donated by the government to the Milwaukee Area Technical College in 1972, which included a drum-based line printer and dual Ampex magnetic tape drives. It was used for a limited number of students as an "extra credit project device" for the next 2-3 years, after which it was scrapped to make space for newer equipment. The fate of the other two units is unknown.

Notes

References

External links
Oral history interview with Louis Fein at Charles Babbage Institute, University of Minnesota, Minneapolis.  Fein discusses establishing computer science as an academic discipline at Stanford Research Institute (SRI) as well as contacts with the University of California—Berkeley, the University of North Carolina, Purdue, International Federation for Information Processing and other institutions.
The 3C Legacy Project

1953 establishments in Massachusetts
1966 disestablishments in Massachusetts
1966 mergers and acquisitions
American companies established in 1953
American companies disestablished in 1966
Companies based in Framingham, Massachusetts
Computer companies established in 1953
Computer companies disestablished in 1966
Defunct computer companies based in Massachusetts
Defunct computer companies of the United States
Defunct computer hardware companies
Electronics companies established in 1953
Minicomputers